Sun Erniang (literally "Second Sister Sun") is a fictional character in Water Margin, one of the Four Great Classical Novels in Chinese literature. Nicknamed "Female Yaksha", she ranks 103rd among the 108 Stars of Destiny and 67th among the 72 Earthly Fiends.

Background
The novel depicts Sun Erniang as having a fierce temper and a vicious look. She has strong limbs that look like clubs. Her nickname is "Female Yaksha" as she resembles the hideous demon in Chinese mythical folklore. Her dressing is also odd, often revealing her dudou, and her makeup is usually heavy. She is trained in martial arts by her father.

One day, while passing by Cross Slope (十字坡; at the intersection of present-day Shen County, Shandong and Fan County, Henan), Sun Erniang's father is intercepted by Zhang Qing, who wants to rob him. After beating Zhang in their fight, he takes him home and teaches him martial arts. He even marries his daughter to Zhang.

After Sun Erniang's father died, the couple run an inn at Cross Slope, where they knock out customers with drugged wine, take their valuables and butcher them to make filling in buns with their flesh. Although he is brutal, Zhang advises Sun not to kill three sorts of people, namely, exiles as among them there are heroic people; monks as they lead an ascetic life; and prostitutes because they suffer many abuses. But Sun does not always follow his advice and may kill anyone according to her whims.

Meeting Lu Zhishen
When Lu Zhishen passes by Cross Slope after leaving the imperial capital Dongjing to escape arrest by Grand Marshal Gao Qiu for thwarting his plan to murder Lin Chong, he eats in Sun Erniang's inn and is knocked out. Just when Sun is about to butcher the monk, Zhang Qing returns in time and stops her, noticing Lu's unusual appearance. After reviving Lu and determining his identity, Zhang Qing suggests that he seek refuge with the outlaw band led by Deng Long at Mount Twin Dragons. Deng, however, blocks Lu‘s way up to the stronghold. He is killed and replaced by the monk when Lu gets into it with a ruse.

Encounters with Wu Song
Later Wu Song, exiled to Mengzhou for killing his sister-in-law and her adulterer lover Ximen Qing to avenge their murder of his brother, also comes by Cross Slope on his way and eats in Sun Erniang's inn. Sensing that Sun is up to no good, Wu pretends to fall unconscious just like his two escorts after having a few cups. But Sun's helpers could not lift him as Wu controls his breath to make himself heavy as iron. So Sun comes up to do the work herself. But Wu surprises her when he uses a grappling hold to pin her down. Just then Zhang Qing comes back and stops the scuffle. The couple apologise upon learning the fellow is the tiger slayer Wu Song. They treat Wu as an honoured guest until he leaves for Mengzhou.

After being framed for theft and nearly murdered in Mengzhou, Wu Song kills Inspector Zhang Mengfang, Instructor Zhang and Jiang the Door God, who were behind all the schemes. He also massacres the family of Inspector Zhang. On his run Wu Song is seized while sleeping in a temple by some men of Zhang Qing. He is released when Zhang recognises him. Sun Erniang proposes that Wu join Lu Zhishen at Mount Twin Dragons. Sun had earlier, in a rash act, butchered an untonsured Buddhist priest, who left behind a Buddhist robe, a pair of swords, a necklace of skulls and a head band. Sun suggests that Wu dress himself up with these articles to look like an itinerant priest with his hair let down to cover the tattoo mark of exile on his face. Wu thus travels safely to Mount Twin Dragons. Sun Erniang and Zhang Qing later also wind up their business and join the stronghold.

After his defeat by the bandits of Liangshan in his military attack to exterminate them, the imperial general Huyan Zhuo flees to Qingzhou (in present-day Shandong) in hopes of redeeming himself by wiping out the bandits there. Mount Twin Dragons, one of the strongholds, concludes that Huyan is a tough opponent and seeks help from Liangshan. Song Jiang comes to Qingzhou with a force and captures Huyan. The bandits of Mount Twin Dragons, including Zhang Qing and his wife, are absorbed into Liangshan.

Campaigns and death
Sun Erniang and her husband are put in charge of an inn which acts as a lookout for Liangshan after the 108 Stars of Destiny came together in what is called the Grand Assembly. The couple participate in campaigns against the Liao invaders and rebel forces in Song territory following amnesty from Emperor Huizong for Liangshan.

In the battle of Qingxi County (清溪縣; present-day Chun'an County, Zhejiang) in the campaign against Fang La, Sun Erniang is slain by enemy officer Du Wei. She is later conferred the posthumous title "Lady of Jingde Commandery" (旌德郡君).

References
 
 
 
 
 
 
 

72 Earthly Fiends
Fictional women soldiers and warriors
Fictional cannibals